Baba Khanjar (also Romanized as Bābā Khanjar) is a village in Shirin Su Rural District, Shirin Su District, Kabudarahang County, Hamadan Province, Iran. At the 2006 census, its population was 1,669, in 336 families.

References 

Populated places in Kabudarahang County